Sekong (also sometimes Xekong, Lao ເຊກອງ) is a province of Laos in the southeast of the country.

It is bordered by Vietnam to the east, Attapeu province to the south, Salavan province to the north, and Champasak province to the west. Sekong also has the smallest population (129,398 as of 2020) and the lowest population density of any province. It was created in 1984 by splitting Salavan province. It is the most diverse province in Laos with 14 ethnic groups. The Sekong River, which divides the province, flows in a southerly direction into Cambodia and is navigable. The river valley has fertile plains interspersed with paddy fields and fruit orchards. Its tropicals forest have many rare species of flora and fauna. The Dakchung Plateau and Xe Xap National Biodiversity Conservation Area are among the areas under protection.

Unlike most of Laos, there are relatively few Buddhist temples (Wat) seen in the province as the predominant belief system is more oriented to animism and ancestral worship. Sekong province is one of the most important coffee-producing areas of Laos.

History
Sekong province was created in 1984, when it was split off from Salavan province and Attapeu province. Sekong is recognized as one of the most ethnically diverse provinces in Laos with 14 ethnic groups reported from a population of 85,000. Since most of these ethnic groups are not Buddhist not many wats are seen in the province as their belief system is more of animism and ancestral worship. During the communist regime, the province was created to give benefits to the local ethnic groups. However, this advantage seems to be on the decline with ethnic Lao groups dominating the political scene and also in the local administration.

Geography

It is bordered by Vietnam to the east, Attapeu province to the south, Salavan province to the north, and Champasak province to the west. Sekong also has the lowest population (about 83,000) and the lowest population density of any province. Sekong is split administratively into four districts: Thateng on the Bolaven Plateau, Lamam in the lowland plain, and Dakchung and Kaleum in the mountainous areas bordering Vietnam.

The Sekong River, which divides the province, flows in a southern direction into Cambodia and is navigable for boats. Long-tail boats are navigated through the river along scenic routes on the edge of the Bolaven Plateau. Freshwater dolphins can be seen in the river. Waterfalls are a common feature in the river valley; some of the popularly known falls are the Tad Hia, Tad Faek and Tad Se Noi (or Tad Hua Khon). The most famous water fall is the Nam Tok Katamtok that is located on the Huay Katam River, deep in the forests of the Bolaven Plateau. The Sekong river valley has fertile plains interspersed with paddy fields and fruit orchards. Its rich tropical forest has many rare species of flora and fauna.

Sekong is among the most remote areas of Laos; even some of its largest villages are virtually inaccessible by road for at least half of the year. The infrastructure is poorly developed. The eastern districts of Dakchung and Kaleum, in particular, are characterized by mostly mountainous terrain which is rugged and difficult to access. This isolation has meant that forest cover, biodiversity, and ethnic traditions have changed less in recent years than in other areas in Laos. However, the province has become much less isolated in recent years, with the upgrading of a major road up from the Mekong valley city of Pakse, plus two major road projects connecting Sekong to Vietnam to the east. Road infrastructure backed by the Vietnamese is part of a regional development strategy spearheaded by Hanoi called the Development Triangle Initiative, aiming to develop links between Vietnam and neighboring underdeveloped provinces in Cambodia and Laos.

Environment
Remaining forest cover in Sekong province is high. Government figures classify over 50% of the province's land area as forest, the majority of it mixed deciduous and semi-evergreen forest, but with pockets of dry dipterocarp forest along the Sekong River valley, and pine forest in the Dakchung highlands.  Much of the natural forest in Sekong has never been commercially logged, but this is changing fast. Commercial timber extraction has been expanding rapidly over the past decade. There is growing pressure on Sekong to log its forests – both from Vietnamese interests (where the wood furniture sector averaged 70% growth per year during 2000–2004) and from Lao companies (who face wood shortages because of dwindling stocks in lowland forests). The economic return from the forest resources of the province, as of 2003, was estimated to be in the range of US$398–$525 per household, more than agricultural income. The revenue to the state from sale of timber was also very substantial, estimated to be US$10.35 per hectare. The natural forests in the province are also helpful in carbon sequestration benefits estimated to be US$124 per hectare and also in watershed improvements, by way of avoiding erosion and reducing flood incidence. Corruption in Sekong province is endemic, and it has reportedly "undermined a successful donor-funded village participatory sustainable forest management initiative."

Protected areas
The Dakchung Plateau is an Important Bird Area (IBA). The habitat is characterized as pine woodland, grassland, degraded semi-evergreen forest, dry evergreen forest, marshy land, and tall grasses areas. Of the avifauna, the yellow-billed nuthatch (Sitta solangiae) is classified as near threatened, while the black-crowned barwing (Actinodura sodangorum) is classified as vulnerable. Other fauna include the Oriental small-clawed otter (Aonyx cinerea), tiger (Panthera tigris), big-headed turtle (Platysternon megacephalum), and herds of Asian elephant (Elephas maximus).

The Xe Sap IBA is in the Xe Xap National Biodiversity Conservation Area (NBCA); the IBA surpasses the NBCA's 1335 km2 boundaries (established in February 1996). The IBA and NBCA are part of two provinces, Sekong and Salavan. The habitat is characterized by various forests (dry evergreen, pine, semi-evergreen, and upper montane), as well as grassland. Two species of gymnosperm were recorded. Its key avifauna includes Blyth's kingfisher (Alcedo hercules), Vietnamese crested argus (Rheinardia ocellata), and yellow-billed nuthatch. Other notable wildlife are two types of primates and one turtle species. An unpaved road from Salavan to Ta-Oy and further east to Samuoy runs the northern border of Xe Sap NBCA. But small paths provide approaches from the main road to villages located on the northern part of the NBCA. The southeastern part of NBCA is difficult to reach. However, the Kong River (or Xe Kong, or Sekong) and its two tributaries Xe Sap and Xe Lon provide access to the reserve by boats. The reserve has many water falls, rocky cliffs and rhododendrons at higher elevations. There are 43 mammals (including 18 key species), 178 birds (18 are key species), 48 reptiles and 33 amphibians; the notable species of wildlife are two species of bears, serow, large antlered muntjac, large number of gaurs and tigers. A particular plant species are Pinus dalatensis and Kinabaluchloa species, a genus of bamboo.

The Phou Ahyon IBA is 148,900 hectares in size. The topography contains the Phou Ahyon massif, which is the highest and largest massif in the country's southern area. The habitat is characterized by dry evergreen forest, Fokienia forest, and upper montane forest. Notable avifauna includes black-crowned barwing, black-hooded laughingthrush (Garrulax milleti), chestnut-eared laughingthrush (G. konkakinhensis), Vietnamese crested argus, golden-winged laughingthrush (G. ngoclinhensis), and yellow-billed nuthatch.

Administrative divisions
The second smallest province in Laos is made up of the following districts:

Demographics
Sekong is ethnically diverse.  Only about 3% of the population are ethnic Lao. The vast majority (97%) come from one of at least 14 distinct ethnic minority groups.  The Alak (21% of the provincial population), Katu (20%), Tarieng (19%) and Nge/Krieng (11%) are the main ethnic groups.  The Lao government classifies these groups as “Lao Theung” (midland Lao), but an ethno-linguistic categorization, based on language families, places them under the Austroasiatic family.  Within this broad family, the ethnic groups of Sekong fall into two linguistic branches: the Katuic (including the Katu and the Nge/Krieng) and the Bahnaric (Alak and Tarieng). Approximately 14,700 Katu live in the province.

Economy
Sekong province is one of the poorest provinces in Laos, second to only Houaphanh province. Infrastructure is relatively under developed, with few having access to clean water and sanitation as of 2000, and the literacy rate is extremely low. Sekong province is one of the most important coffee-producing areas of Laos along with Salavan province and Champasak province. Sekong province is Laos' main honey-producing area. Purpose-made tree cavities are a particular tree beekeeping methods practiced in three districts: Dakchung, Kalum, and Lama.

In June 2020, the Lao government approved a Singapore energy firm's plan to develop a new US$1.7 billion fossil fuel-fired thermal power plant in Sekong province. The plant will produce 1,000 megawatts (MW) of power. The plant will reportedly run on "domestically-extracted fuel sources, adding value to local natural resources." Laos has an estimated 600-700 million tons of coal reserves nation-wide, primarily lignite, one of the most heavily polluting fuels.

In February 2021, the Lao government announced that two lignite-fired power plants will constructed in Sekong province. Work is to begin in 2021 and be completed by 2025. The electricity generated will be sold to Cambodia for 7.2 US cents per kWh. The first plant will be built by Phonesack Group in Kaleum District. It will have an installed capacity of 1,800MW. The company will invest between US$3–4 billion, including the construction of transmission lines to export electricity to Cambodia. The second coal-fired, 700 MW plant will be built in La Mam District by a Chinese company that will invest over US$1 billion in the project. The government claims that coal reserves adjacent to the plants are sufficient to power the plants for the entire 25-year concession period.

Culture

Distinctive cultural features in the province relate to the indigenous ethnic cultures with spiritual links to the land, including five different "Lao Theung" languages with one becoming extinct. There are several funerary and sacred forests, Indochina War relics, and a stretch of the Ho Chi Minh Trail. To ward off falling bombs during the Indochina War, some animist tribal people placed a talisman above their huts. 

Weaving activity in Sekong City has unique textile designs featuring multicolored lines and is aided by a back-tensioned loom called the "hip loom". Katu women also apply a warping technique to their weaving. In addition to the Katu, the Talieng (Tarieng) of Sekong City also use back-tensioned looms, as do the Harlak in Kasangkang village, which is located just outside Sekong City. The men of the Talieng ethnic group wrap a Tha Khatil cloth around their waist as a traditional costume. Among the Mon-Khmer, stripped lines are incorporated into clothing by use of the back strap loom. In addition to geometric stripes, decorative patterns include animals or plants, considered to be traditional motifs, or planes and bombs, which have a historical context. The textiles produced by Nge ethnic group are attractive. Traditional Lao skirts (sin) are a specialty of the Alak group. Also of note are Pha Biang (scarves) and Pha Kaan (head cloth scarves), including turbans, bonnets, hats and diadems. 

Woodcarvings and traditional longhouses are features in many villages, with visitor attractions at Kandone Village.

References

Sources

Further reading
 Non-Timber Forest Products Project (Cambodia). Hydropower on the Sesan/Sekong River. Mekong factsheet, 1. Phnom Penh: NTFP Project, Ratanakiri province, 1997. 
 Saiyavong, Somphāvan. Phao Trīang: vithī sīvit kap sathāpattayakam = The life and house of the Tariang people. [Vīangchan]: Sathāban Khonkhwā Vatthanatham, Kasūang Thalǣng Khāo læ Vatthanatham, 2003.
 Thongkum, Theraphan L. Phāsā khō̜ng nānā chonphao nai khwǣng Sēkō̜ng Lāo Tai: khwāmrū phư̄nthān phư̄a kānwičhai læ phatthanā = Languages of the tribes in Xekong Province Southern Laos : a foundation for research and development. Krung Thēp: Samnakngān Kō̜ngthun Sanapsanun Kānwičhai, 2001. 
 United Nations Development Programme (Viangchan, Laos). Socio-Economic Profile of Sekong Province. Lao PDR: province profiles series, no. 3. Vientiane: United Nations Development Programme, 1997.
 Vythilingam, I., et al. "The prevalence of Anopheles (Diptera: Culicidae) mosquitoes in Sekong Province, Lao PDR in relation to malaria transmission." Tropical Medicine & International Health. 8.6 (2003): 525–535.

 
Provinces of Laos